The Murdoch Children's Research Institute (MCRI) is an Australian paediatric medical research institute located in Melbourne, Victoria, affiliated with the Royal Children's Hospital and the University of Melbourne. The institute has six research themes: cellular biology, clinical sciences, genetics, infection and immunity, population health, and data science.

History
The institute was established in 1986 by Professor David Danks, after media magnate Rupert Murdoch and his family donated 5 million to the Birth Defects Research Institute at the Royal Children's Hospital in Melbourne in 1984. The institute was later renamed the Murdoch Institute for Research into Birth Defects, and Rupert's mother, Dame Elisabeth Murdoch became its patron.

In 2000, the Murdoch Institute merged with the medical research institute of the Royal Children's Hospital to become the Murdoch Children's Research Institute.

See also

Health in Australia

References

External links

Murdoch Children's Research Institute
1986 establishments in Australia
Pediatric organizations
University of Melbourne
Research institutes established in 1986
Murdoch family